Barman or its variants Burman (Bengali: বর্মন), Varman (Hindi: बर्मन, Sanskrit: वर्मन्), (Punjabi ਬਰਮਨ), Varma, Verma (Kannada: ವರ್ಮ, Malayalam: വര്‍മ, Tamil: வர்மன், Telugu: వర్మ), are surnames used in the Indian subcontinent.

In Sanskrit language, Varma (Sanskrit: वर्मा) is the masculine form of the word for "Armour".

Indian traditional usage 
Barman was the surname used by members of the Cochin, Travancore, Tripura and other royal families.

Geographical distribution
As of 2014, 96.3% of all known bearers of the surname Barman were residents of India and 3.4% were residents of Bangladesh. In India, the frequency of the surname was higher than national average in the following states:
 1. West Bengal (1: 45)
 2. Assam (1: 71)
 3. Tripura (1: 285)

Notable people
Notable people with the surname include:
 Chandravarman (4th century CE) was a king of the Pushkarana kingdom in the Bankura district of West Bengal extended eastward to the Faridpur district of Bangladesh
Mulavarman, was the king of the Kutai Martadipura Kingdom located in eastern Borneo around the year 400 CE, Indonesia and Malaysia
 Bhadravarman I is the 5th century King of Champa, Vietnam
 Purnavarman is the 5th century king of Tarumanagara, Indonesia 
 Bhaskaravarman (7th century CE) was a king of Varman dynasty, Kamarupa, India
 Yashovarman (c. 725 – 752), king of Kannauj in the western Ganges plain (northern India)
 Avantivarman (855-883 CE), founder of Utpala dynasty, Kashmir (norther Indian) 
 Adwaita Mallabarman (1914), Indian writer
 Basudeb Barman (born 1935), Communist Party of India politician
 Hiten Barman (born 1950), All India Forward Bloc politician
 Kirit Pradyot Deb Barman (born 1977), Hindu monarch, Tripura, North-eastern India
 Ranen Barman (born 1969), Revolutionary Socialist Party politician
 Uddabh Barman (21st century), Indian communist politician
 R. D. Burman (19th century), Indian music director
 S. D. Burman Bollywood music director and playback singer of Indian music (1932-1975)
 Swapna Barman Indian athletic gold medalist (W.B)
 Somdev Devvarman Indian tennis player (A.S)
 Anand Burman chairman of Dabur (W.B)
 Upendranath Barman  Indian politician
 Kirit Bikram Kishore Deb Barman last King of Tripura, a princely state in northeastern India

References

See also 
 Varman (surname)

Indian surnames